The Sochinsky okrug was a district (okrug) of the Black Sea Governorate of the Caucasus Viceroyalty of the Russian Empire. It bordered the Kuban Oblast to the north, the Tuapsinsky okrug to the west, the Sukhumi okrug to the east, and the Black Sea to the south. The area of the Sochinsky okrug mostly corresponds to the Krasnodar Krai region of the Russian Federation. The district was eponymously named for its administrative centre, Sochi.

Demographics

Russian Empire Census 
The plurality of the population indicated Armenian to be their mother tongue, with significant Russian, Greek, Ukrainian, Circassian, and Georgian speaking minorities.

Kavkazskiy kalendar 

Notes

References

Bibliography 

Okrugs of Black Sea Governorate
Black Sea Governorate
Caucasus Viceroyalty (1801–1917)
History of Kuban
States and territories disestablished in 1918
1918 disestablishments in Russia